Nanda is a town  in Chandrapur district in the state of Maharashtra, India.

The town has been called a "mini India" as it has a large number of people from all over India. The reason behind the population diversity is UltraTech Cement, a cement company that created employment opportunities for nearby villagers.

History
Before 1983,  Nanda  was a village with agriculture as its main economy. But after L&T Cement Plant was established in 1983, the business and population has expanded.

Demographics
Nanda is surrounded by four cement factories. Dust pollution levels are high, but the industry is the main source of income for this area.

Cement Industries nearby :
UltraTech Cement, Awarpur
Murali Agro Cement, Naranda
Manikgarh Cement, Gadchandur
Ambuja Cement, Upparwahi

Nearby Towns :
 Gadchandur ( 7 km )
 Korpana ( 25 km )
 Rajura ( 31 km ) 
 Ballarpur ( 38 km )

Nearby Villages :
 Bibi ( 2 km )
 Awarpur ( 2.5 km )
 Pimpalgaon ( 4 km )
 Duddeery   ( 1km )

Transport
Nanda have road transport State Transport ( ST ) and private bus transport facility direct to Nagpur.

Education
Nanda have several esteemed educational institutions. Some of the private educational institutes are:
 Aditya Birla Public School Awarpur
 Shri Shivaji English School & Jr. College
 Prabhu Ramchandra School & College
 Jawaharlal Nehru School Awarpur
 Priyadarshini vidyalya nanda

Economy
UltraTech Cement is the major employer in this area. Many people migrated to Nanda area due to this cement plant.

Nanda has a local economy of stores and businesses serving the localities and nearby villages.

References

Villages in Chandrapur district
Talukas in Maharashtra